The Time Is Now is the seventh studio album by British singer Craig David, released on 26 January 2018. The album features guest appearances from JP Cooper, Bastille, AJ Tracey, Ella Mai, Kaytranada and GoldLink. The first single from the album, titled "Heartline", was released on 14 September 2017, through David's official YouTube account.

The album reached number two in the United Kingdom, making it David's fifth UK top 10 album.

Background
On 15 September 2017, less than a year after the release of his comeback album Following My Intuition which became his first chart-topper for 16 years, David announced the follow-up, The Time Is Now. In an interview, David said: "The motivation and inspiration behind this album was all down to the huge realisation that even when I wasn't as focused, there were amazing lessons to be learnt."

The album features collaborations with Bastille, AJ Tracey, Kaytranada and GoldLink.

Singles
The first single from the album, "Heartline", was released on 14 September 2017, and peaked at 24 in the UK. The second single, "I Know You", featuring the British band Bastille, was released on 23 November 2017, and was commercially more successful than his recent singles, peaking at five in the UK.

Critical reception
{{Album ratings
| MC        = 56/100
| rev1      = AllMusic
| rev1score = 
| rev2      = Clash
| rev2score = 6/10
| rev3      = MusicOMH
| rev3score = 
| rev4      = NME
| rev4score = 
| rev5      = Pitchfork| rev5score = 5.5/10
| rev6      = PopMatters| rev6score = 5/10
| rev7      = Under the Radar| rev7score = 3/10
}}The Time Is Now received mixed reviews from music critics. At Metacritic, which assigns a normalised rating out of 100 to reviews from mainstream critics, the album has an average score of 56 based on 12 reviews, indicating "mixed or average reviews".

Commercial performanceThe Time Is Now reached number two on the UK Albums Chart, debuting with sales of 16,874 copies, behind the soundtrack of The Greatest Showman''.

Tour
David embarked on a tour and made appearances at music festivals around England, the United States, the Middle East and Europe to promote the album.

Track listing

Notes
  signifies a vocal producer.

Personnel
Credits adapted from album’s liner notes.

Mark Asari – backing vocals (tracks 9, 14), chant vocals (track 1)
Jonas Blue – producer and mixing (track 2)
Raoul Chen – producer, engineer, mixing, backing vocals, drum programming, and instruments (track 6)
Wez Clarke – mixing (tracks 1, 3, 7, 14, 15)
JP Cooper – vocals (track 7)
Craig David – vocals (all tracks)
Ed Drewett – chant vocals (track 1)
Phebe Edwards – backing vocals (tracks 4, 5, 12)
Lauren Faith – backing vocals (track 4)
Rachel Furner – backing vocals (track 12)
GoldLink – vocals (track 9)
Manon Grandjean – engineer (tracks 4, 5, 8, 10, 12)
Stuart Hawkes – mastering (all tracks)
Tre Jean-Marie – producer (tracks 1, 7, 14, 15); vocal production, vocal mixing, and background vocals (track 9); chant vocals (track 1)
Kaytranada – producer and mixing (track 9)
William Kennard – producer, mixing, instrumentation, and programming (track 13)
Chris Laws – engineer, drums, and percussion (track 3)
Tim Laws – guitar (track 3)
Colin Lester – executive producer
Andy Mac – talkbox (track 14)
Steve Mac – producer and keyboards (track 3)
Rob MacFarlane – engineer (tracks 8, 13)
Ella Mai – vocals (track 15)
Jacob Manson – producer, engineer, mixing, guitar, keyboards, and drum programming (track 11)
Brandon Michael – chant vocals (track 1)
Saul Milton – producer, mixing, instrumentation, and programming (track 13)
Nosaappollo – producer (track 15)
Tyrell "169" Paul – producer (tracks 4, 10, 12), drum programming (tracks 4, 10)
Dann Pursey – engineer (track 3)
Carmen Reece – backing vocals (track 8)
Sillkey – additional production (track 14)
Dan Smith – vocals (track 8)
Fraser T Smith – producer, mixing, keyboards, and drum programming (tracks 4, 5, 8, 10, 12); guitar (tracks 4, 10)
AJ Tracey – vocals (track 11)

Charts

Release history

References

2018 albums
Craig David albums
Albums produced by Kaytranada
RCA Records albums
Albums produced by Tre Jean-Marie